The 2011 German Open Grand Prix Gold was a badminton tournament which took place at the RWE-Sporthalle in Mulheim an der Ruhr, Germany on 2–6 March 2011 and had a total purse of $120,000. This is for the first time this tournament was graded as a Grand Prix Gold event, where before rate as Grand Prix event with a total pursue of $80,000.

Men's singles

Seeds

 Lin Dan (champion)
 Chen Jin (final)
 Boonsak Ponsana (semifinals)
 Park Sung-hwan (semifinals)
 Hu Yun (first round)
 Marc Zwiebler (second round)
 Son Wan-ho (quarterfinals)
 Wang Zhengming (third round)
 Dicky Palyama (third round)
 Kazushi Yamada (third round)
 Sho Sasaki (withdrew)
 Brice Leverdez (third round)
 Wong Wing Ki (third round)
 Hans-Kristian Vittinghus (third round)
 Tanongsak Saensomboonsuk (second round)
 Carl Baxter (first round)

Finals

Top half

Section 1

Section 2

Section 3

Section 4

Bottom half

Section 1

Section 2

Section 3

Section 4

Women's singles

Seeds

 Juliane Schenk (quarterfinals)
 Bae Youn-joo (first round)
 Yip Pui Yin (first round)
 Ella Diehl (first round)
 Liu Xin (champion)
 Yao Jie (first round)
 Petya Nedelcheva (first round)
 Eriko Hirose (first round)

Finals

Top half

Section 1

Section 2

Bottom half

Section 3

Section 4

Men's doubles

Seeds

  Ko Sung-hyun / Yoo Yeon-seong (semifinals)
  Jung Jae-sung / Lee Yong-dae (champion)
  Koo Kien Keat / Tan Boon Heong (semifinals)
  Hirokatsu Hashimoto / Noriyasu Hirata (second round)
  Mohd Fairuzizuan Mohd Tazari / Ong Soon Hock (second round)
  Ingo Kindervater / Johannes Schöttler (first round)
  Gan Teik Chai / Tan Bin Shen (second round)
  Chris Adcock / Andrew Ellis (first round)

Finals

Top half

Section 1

Section 2

Bottom half

Section 3

Section 4

Women's doubles

Seeds

  Miyuki Maeda / Satoko Suetsuna (quarterfinals)
  Duanganong Aroonkesorn / Kunchala Voravichitchaikul (quarterfinals)
  Petya Nedelcheva /  Anastasia Russkikh (withdrew)
  Valeri Sorokina / Nina Vislova (quarterfinals)
  Mizuki Fujii / Reika Kakiiwa (champion)
  Lotte Jonathans / Paulien van Dooremalen (second round)
  Shizuka Matsuo / Mami Naito (semifinals)
  Sandra Marinello / Birgit Michels (second round)

Finals

Top half

Section 1

Section 2

Bottom half

Section 3

Section 4

Mixed doubles

Seeds

  Sudket Prapakamol / Saralee Thoungthongkam (first round)
  Robert Mateusiak / Nadiezda Zieba (quarterfinals)
  Songphon Anugritayawon / Kunchala Voravichitchaikul (semifinals)
  Michael Fuchs / Birgit Michels (first round)
  Yoo Yeon-seong / Kim Min-jung (first round)
  Robert Blair /  Gabrielle White (champion)
  Chris Adcock /  Imogen Bankier (semifinals)
  Valeriy Atrashchenkov / Elena Prus (withdrew)

Finals

Top half

Section 1

Section 2

Bottom half

Section 3

Section 4

References

External links
 Tournament Link

German Open (badminton)
Sport in Mülheim
Open (badminton)
German Open Grand Prix Gold